Chiefdom of Yao'an, ruled by the Gao clan, was a Bai autonomous Tusi chiefdom during Yuan, Ming and Qing dynasty. The chiefdom located at the convergence of Yunnan and Sichuan. 

The Gao clan were descendants of Gao Shengtai, whom was the emperor of Dali from 1094 to 1096. The Gao clan ruled Yao'an for more than 700 years, surviving several dynastic changes in China, until its last ruler Gao Houde was arrested by Qing Chinese in 1725. In 1729, Yao'an was fully annexed into the central bureaucratic system of the Qing dynasty.

List of chieftains of Yao'an
Below are Yao'an chieftains:

References

Tusi in Yunnan
Chuxiong Yi Autonomous Prefecture
States and territories established in 1147
States and territories disestablished in 1729
Yao'an County